Limamarela is a community council located in the Leribe District of Lesotho. Its population in 2006 was 8,733.

Villages
The community of Limamarela includes the villages of Ha Jakalasi, Ha Joma, Ha Konstabole, Ha Lejone, Ha Lukase, Ha Masokotso, Ha Matšoele, Ha Mohanyane, Ha Mpeli, Ha Noha, Ha Paepae (Mpakatheng), Ha Rafanyane, Ha Sebotha, Ha Sefako, Ha Sekhele, Ha Semela, Ha Sepinare, Ha Thibeli, Ha Thoora (Ha Mallane), Ha Tšepo, Khohloaneng, Khubetsoana, Kobong (Ha Mallane), Lehlakaneng, Lepaqoa, Makhalong, Mamohau, Maphutseng, Masuoaneng and Thoteng (Ha Sebotha).

References

External links
 Google map of community villages

Populated places in Leribe District